SKK can refer to:

 Slovak koruna, former Slovak currency
 Shaktoolik Airport
 Shaolin Kempo Karate, a martial art
 SKK Kotwica Kołobrzeg, Polish basketball team
 SKK Lighting company by Shiu-Kay Kan